Vagif Javadov (born 25 May 1989) is an Azerbaijani football coach and a former player who played as a striker. He was voted Azerbaijani Footballer of the Year in 2009.

Javadov started playing football at age 7 and attended one of the local football schools under Vagif Pashayev. He joined CSKA's youth system at 11, playing for the club's youth and reserve teams as a striker. In 2007, he left CSKA Moscow and joined Qarabağ.

Club career
After settling into the team and under the tutelage of Gurban Gurbanov, Javadov's play improved immensely and he managed to become a favourite of FK Qarabağ fans shortly thereafter. Javadov reaffirmed his importance to the club with an impressive first two seasons with FK Qarabağ, where he made almost 100 appearances and scored many goals in the league winning campaign. And he has also played in Europa League well in the matches against Rosenborg in 2010 and Twente. After matches against Twente, the Dutch team bought the footballer. His full name is Vagif Fuzuli oglu Javadov.

On 26 December 2009, following on from a successful World Cup 2010 qualification and Europa League campaign, he signed a four-and-a-half-year contract with FC Twente for an undisclosed fee. However, he failed to debut within 8 months following a string of injuries.

On 30 August 2010, Twente agreed to loan to FC Baku for a year with the option that Twente's scouts will decide after the loan spell, his return to the club or selling permanently to Baku.

On 29 June 2011, Javadov signed with the Volga. Following 11 goalless appearances for the Russian club, in January 2012 Javadov left the Volga as a free agent due to salary delays. On 17 January 2012, he signed a new contract with his former club FK Qarabağ.

In June 2013, Javadov signed for Inter Baku. After one year with Inter Baku, Javadov moved to TFF First League team Gaziantep B.B., signing a two-year contract, but left Gaziantep B.B. in January 2015, joining fellow TFF First League side Boluspor on a six-month contract with the option of an additional year.

On 31 August 2015, Javadov signed a four-month loan deal with Gabala FK from FK Khazar Lankaran. Javadov left Gabala at the end of his loan deal.

On 17 January 2018, Keşla FK announced the signing of Javadov on a six-month contract. On 22 June 2018, Javadov a new contract with Keşla until the end of the 2018/19 season.

International career
For Azerbaijan, Javadov is capped 51 times, scoring 9 goal. He made his national team debut on 18 May 2006 against Moldova in friendly match. He scored his first goal on 11 March 2007 against Kyrgyzstan in a friendly match.

Personal life
Javadov is the nephew of Isgandar Javadov, a famous Azerbaijani football player of the 80s.

Career statistics

Club

International

Statistics accurate as of match played 16 November 2014

International goals

Honours

Club
 Qarabağ
Azerbaijan Cup: 2008–09

 Twente
Eredivisie: 2009–10
Johan Cruijff Shield: 2010

Individual
Azerbaijani Footballer of the Year (1): 2009.

References

External links

 

1989 births
Footballers from Baku
Living people
Azerbaijani footballers
Azerbaijan international footballers
Association football forwards
PFC CSKA Moscow players
Qarabağ FK players
FC Twente players
FC Baku players
FC Volga Nizhny Novgorod players
Shamakhi FK players
Gaziantep F.K. footballers
Boluspor footballers
Khazar Lankaran FK players
Gabala FC players
Sumgayit FK players
AZAL PFK players
Azerbaijan Premier League players
Russian Premier League players
TFF First League players
Azerbaijani expatriate footballers
Expatriate footballers in Russia
Azerbaijani expatriate sportspeople in Russia
Expatriate footballers in the Netherlands
Azerbaijani expatriate sportspeople in the Netherlands
Expatriate footballers in Turkey
Azerbaijani expatriate sportspeople in Turkey
Azerbaijani football managers
Azerbaijani expatriate sportspeople in Kazakhstan